The M8 is the busiest motorway in Scotland. It connects the country's two largest cities, Glasgow and Edinburgh, and serves other large communities including Airdrie, Coatbridge, Greenock, Livingston and Paisley. A major construction project to build the final section between Newhouse and Baillieston was completed on 30 April 2017. The motorway has one service station, Heart of Scotland Services, previously named Harthill due to its proximity to the village.

History
With the advent of motorway-building in the United Kingdom in the late 1950s, the M8 was planned as one of a core of new motorways, designed to replace the A8 road as a high-capacity alternative for intercity travel. The motorway was constructed piecemeal in several stages bypassing towns, beginning in 1965 with the opening by Minister of State for Scotland George Willis of the bypass of Harthill.  In 1968 the Renfrew Bypass was opened as the A8(M), becoming part of the M8 when the motorway to the west was connected. The Glasgow inner city section was constructed between 1968 and 1972, using a scheme outlined in the Bruce Report, which was published as the Second World War was closing, and which set out a series of initiatives to regenerate the city. Bruce's scheme evolved into what would become the Glasgow Inner Ring Road, a motorway "box" which would encircle the  city centre, connected to the Renfrew Bypass at its south western corner, and the Monkland Motorway (built over the former route of the Monkland Canal) towards Edinburgh at its north eastern corner.  Together, these three sections of motorway make up the present day M8.

Most of the motorway's length was complete by 1980. Since then, there has been a new interchange with the M80 motorway added in 1992, a  eastern extension from Newbridge to the then-new Edinburgh City Bypass in 1995, and the new junction on the approach to the Kingston Bridge in Glasgow connecting to the new M74 extension in 2011. As part of the Scottish Government's 'M8 M73 M74 Motorway Improvements programme', on which construction began in early 2015, the remaining unfinished section between Baillieston (J8) and Newhouse (J6) was built, alongside other major improvements enhancing connectivity to the local road network, M73, and M74. The new section was fully opened on 30 April 2017. On 6 December 2019, the Southbar interchange (J29a) was reopened to facilitate regeneration in the Bishopton area, having been previously closed during the 1970s.

Route

From the Edinburgh City Bypass, the road runs west to junction with the M9 motorway (for the Forth Road Bridge), bypassing to the north of Livingston and south of Bathgate. It continues across Scotland's Central Belt. The next section – originally designated the Monkland Motorway – begins on the boundary of the City of Glasgow at the M73 motorway junction (the main interchange for all routes south via the M74 motorway) before passing through the districts of Barlanark, Riddrie, Dennistoun and Townhead (following the route of the abandoned Monkland Canal) on the way directly into the city centre. The central section – the uncompleted Glasgow Inner Ring Road – contains numerous junctions serving local communities including Cowcaddens, Garnethill, Kelvingrove and Anderston. It then crosses the River Clyde on the Kingston Bridge, runs west through Kinning Park, Bellahouston and Hillington before leaving Glasgow.

The M8 nominally comprises sections of the international E-road network, namely E05 (Langbank-Baillieston) and E16 (Baillieston-Edinburgh), although neither is signposted – no such roads are in the United Kingdom.

Criticism

The central Glasgow section of the M8 is unusual amongst UK motorways (and more similar to many US Interstates) in that it directly bisects an urban city centre, whereas most other motorways bypass such centres. This section is mainly elevated on a concrete viaduct, lowering pollution concentrations but exposing some public spaces, roof terraces and other parts of buildings to noise and shading.

Some slip roads in the Glasgow section unusually enter and exit from the overtaking (right-hand) lane.

The motorway includes one of the busiest river crossings in Europe, Glasgow's Kingston Bridge.

Several incomplete structures were built around the motorway - at least 3 have been demolished or reused from the 1960s dubbed Bridges to Nowhere.  A few incomplete structures remain.

The cause of most traffic congestion on the urban section is traffic from the M73 and M80 routes onto the eastern section of M8 which within  reduces from five lanes to two on the Kingston Bridge approaches. Prior to the construction of the M74 extension, attempts were made to minimise delays on this section; these included restricting exits around the Kingston Bridge, a ramp metering programme, and expanded use of electronic signing above and beside the motorway as part of the CITRAC (Centrally Integrated TRAffic Control) system.

The M8 is also criticised as a barrier to wildlife access (for example the reintroduced beaver) from the north of Scotland to the Southern Uplands.

Problems solved
Successive failed attempts were made to build the southern flank of the Glasgow Inner Ring Road envisaged by the Bruce Report of the late 1940s. The eastern section had been planned to run north/south close to the High Street of Glasgow, through or under Glasgow Green to the southside of the Clyde. Public opinion was strongly against this and the eastern section was shelved, with a much later M74 connecting the far-eastern areas of Glasgow. This section, which is an extension of the M74 was built to a different route, intended to funnel long-distance traffic from the north and south which is bound for the southern Clyde Coast and allow it to bypass the urban section of the M8. Following many years of intensive political discussion and legal battles, the M74 completion began in 2008 and opened in June 2011. Indications are that the new road has been successful in reducing traffic levels on the urban section of the M8.

Junctions

See also
List of motorways in the United Kingdom

References

External links

Scottish Roads Archive - The M8 Motorway
CBRD
Motorway Database – M8
Videos – M8
Pathetic Motorways – A8(M) Renfrew Bypass
The Motorway Archive – M8
Eastern Scotland Section
Western Scotland Section

Motorways in Scotland
Transport in Edinburgh
Transport in Glasgow
Transport in Renfrewshire
Transport in West Lothian
Transport in North Lanarkshire